The 1936 Lewes by-election was held on 18 June 1936.  The by-election was held due to the elevation to the peerage of the incumbent Conservative MP, John Loder.  It was won by the Conservative candidate Tufton Beamish.

References

Lewes by-election
Politics of Wealden District
Lewes
Lewes by-election
Lewes by-election
By-elections to the Parliament of the United Kingdom in East Sussex constituencies
20th century in Sussex